= Peiron =

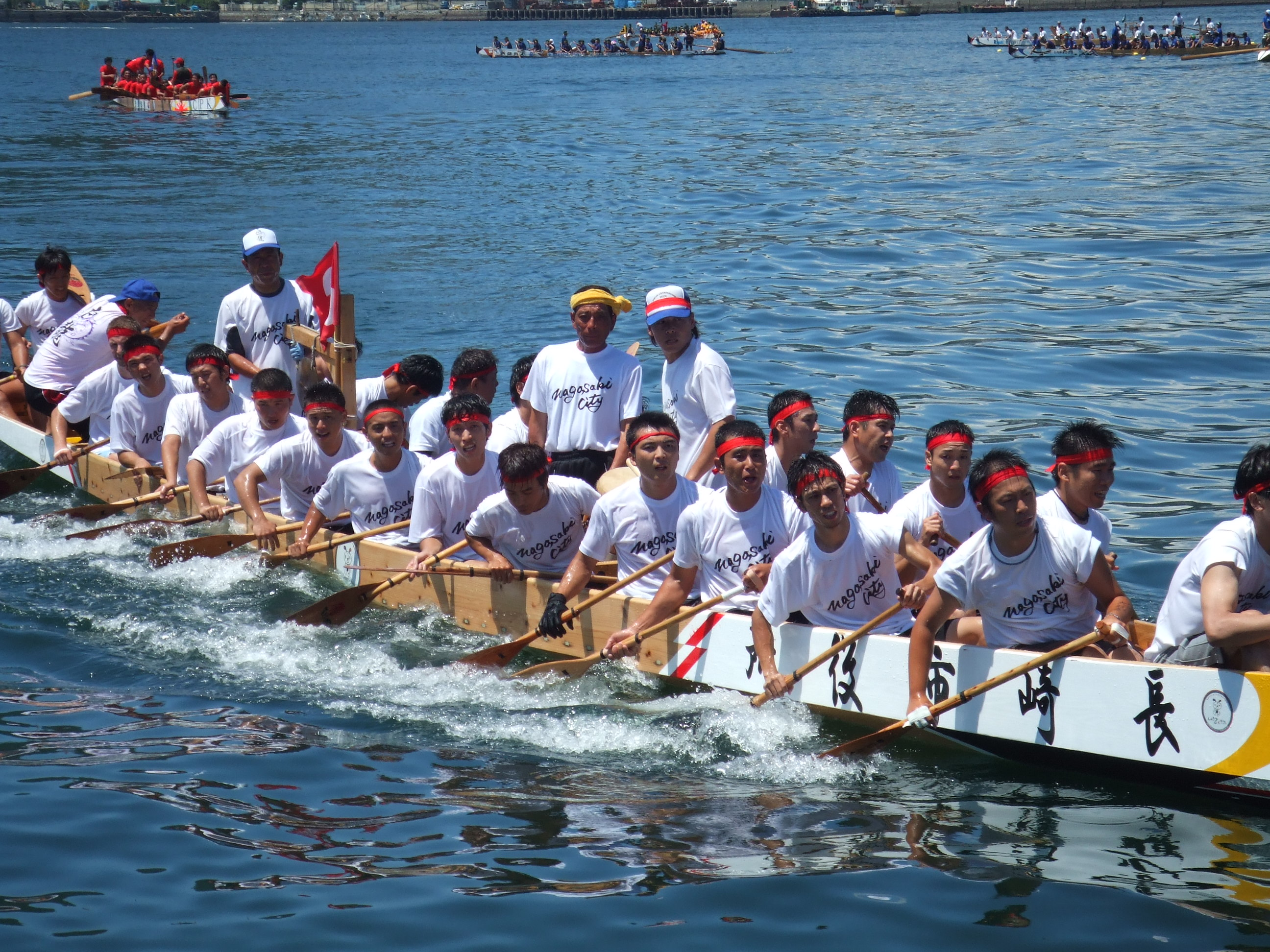

Peiron (ペーロンPeiron) is a traditional Japanese paddled watercraft sport that has its roots in Chinese dragon boat racing.

The term Peiron is derived from the Chinese expression 白龍 (Bai Long (white dragon)).
